City Under Siege is a 1974 Italian poliziottesco film directed by Romolo Guerrieri. The film is loosely based on Il commissario di Torino by Riccardo Marcato and Ugo Novelli.

Plot
Michele Parrino (Enrico Maria Salerno) is a grouchy, solitary, sickly but legitimate police commissioner in Turin. Parrino, helped by boozer journalist of La Stampa Paolo Ferrero (Luciano Salce) and supported by his wealthy girlfriend Cristina (Françoise Fabian), shall investigate about a murder of a young woman, daughter of a rich man.

Also if his city appear like an historical and industrial center, with a lot of rich family, Parrino's investigations discover another reality: a deceiver city, when the most rich capitalists live in luxury surrounded by vices, and the common people live of illusions.
At the end, Parrino succeed to foil a prostitution and narcotics ring, but in the attempt of arrest the bosses (well-known aristocrats and industrialists), Parrino is transferred to the Guardia di Finanza and the Ferrero's article is blocked by his director.

For revenge, Parrino and Ferrero go to Teatro Regio as guests, but with the only goal of taunt the crime lords giving to them compromising sexual photos.
Finally, Parrino and Ferrero distance themselves from the theatre to a dark night.

Cast 
Enrico Maria Salerno: Michele Parrino
Françoise Fabian: Cristina Cournier 
Luciano Salce: Paolo Ferrero 
Bruno Zanin: Maria's young lover
Paola Quattrini: Anna 
Monica Monet: Luisa Grami 
Francesco Ferracini: Balistrieri
Tino Scotti: Cavalier Battista 
Gipo Farassino: Polito 
Raffaele Curi: Franco 
Antonino Faà di Bruno : Colonel Peretti 
Maria D'Incoronato : Maria 
Anna Campori : Maria's lover's mother
Attilio Dottesio : Coroner

Production
City Under Siege was filmed at Icet-De Paolis in Milan and on location in Turin. Producer Luigi Rovere gave the director who guaranteed the director the luxury of shooting the film in eleven weeks.

Release
City Under Siege was distributed theatrically by Cineriz in Italy on 25 October 1974. The film grossed a total of 1,309,698,000 Italian lire domestically.

See also
 List of Italian films of 1974

References

Footnotes

Sources

External links

Poliziotteschi films
1974 crime films
1974 films
Films directed by Romolo Guerrieri
Films scored by Carlo Rustichelli
1970s Italian films